The World Academy of Sciences (TWAS) is a merit-based science academy established for developing countries, uniting 1,000 scientists in some 70 countries. Its principal aim is to promote scientific capacity and excellence for sustainable development in developing countries. It was formerly known as the Third World Academy of Sciences. Its headquarters is located on the premises of the Abdus Salam International Centre for Theoretical Physics (ICTP) in Trieste, Italy.

History
TWAS was founded in 1983 under the leadership of the Nobel Laureate Abdus Salam of Pakistan by a group of distinguished scientists who were determined to do something about the dismal state of scientific research in developing countries.

 Although developing countries account for 80% of the world's population, only 28% of the world's scientists hail from these countries. This fact reflects the lack of innovative potential necessary to solve real-life problems affecting poor nations.
 A chronic lack of funds for research often forces scientists in developing countries into intellectual isolation, jeopardizing their careers, their institutions and, ultimately, their nations.
 Scientists in developing countries tend to be poorly paid and gain little respect for their work because the role that scientific research can play in development efforts is underestimated. This in turn leads to brain drain in favour of the North that further impoverishes the South.
 Research institutions and universities in the South are under-funded, forcing scientists to work in difficult conditions and often with outdated equipment.

The founding members of TWAS therefore decided to set up an organization that would help to:
 Recognize, support and promote excellence in scientific research in the South;
 Provide promising scientists in the South with research facilities necessary for the advancement of their work;
 Facilitate contacts between individual scientists and institutions in the South;
 Encourage South–North cooperation between individuals and centres of scholarship;
 Promote scientific research on major developing countries problems.

Since its inception, TWAS's operational expenses have largely been covered by generous contributions of the Italian government; since 1991 UNESCO has been responsible for the administration of TWAS finance and staff on the basis of an agreement signed by the director general of UNESCO and the president of TWAS.

It was named "Third World Academy of Sciences" until 2004 and "TWAS, the academy of sciences for the developing world" before September 2012,
when it was renamed to is current name, "The World Academy of Sciences for the advancement of science in developing countries".

Founding fellows
The founding fellows of 1983 include
 Hua Luogeng (1910–1985), China
 Nil Ratan Dhar (1892–1987), India
 Luis F. Leloir (1906–1987), Argentina
 Benjamin Peary Pal (1906–1989), India
 Ignacio Bernal (1910–1992), Mexico
 Gerardo Reichel-Dolmatoff (1912–1994), Colombia
 Emilio Rosenblueth (1926–1994), Mexico
 Salimuzzaman Siddiqui (1897–1994), Pakistan
 Abdus Salam (1926–1996), Pakistan
 Carlos Chagas Filho (1910–2000), Brazil
 Johanna Döbereiner (1924–2000), Brazil
 Gopalasamudram Narayana Ramachandran (1922–2001), India
 Thomas Risley Odhiambo (1931–2003), Kenya
 Marcel Roche (1920–2003), Venezuela
 Sivaramakrishna Chandrasekhar (1930–2004), India
 Thomas Adeoye Lambo (1923–2004), Nigeria
 Autar Singh Paintal (1925–2004), India
 Hélio Gelli Pereira (1918–1994), Brazil, United Kingdom
 Khem Singh Gill (1930–2019), India
 Ricardo Bressani Castignoli (1926–2015), Guatemala
 Daniel Adzei Bekoe (1928–2020), Ghana
 Albert Rakoto Ratsimamanga (1907-2001), Madagascar
  Félix Malu wa Kalenga (1936-2011), Democratic Republic of Congo
 Subrahmanyan Chandrasekhar (1909-1995), India, USA
 C.R. Rao (b. 1920), India, USA
 Shiing-Shen Chern (1911-2004), China, USA
 C.N.R. Rao (b.1934), India
 Sir Michael Atiyah (1929-2019), United Kingdom, Lebanon
 Baruj Benacerraf (1920-2011), Venezuela, USA
 Humberto Fernández-Morán (1924-1999), Venezuela, Sweden
 Ali Javan (1926-2016), Iran, USA
Har Gobind Khorana (1922-2011), India, USA
 M. G. K. Menon (1928-2016), India
 Ricardo Miledi (1927-2017), Mexico
 César Milstein (1927-2004), Argentina, United Kingdom
 M.S. Swaminathan (b. 1925), India
 Yang Chen-Ning (b. 1922), China, USA
 Crodowaldo Pavan (1919-2009), Brazil
 Tsung-Dao Lee (b. 1926), China, USA
 Devendra Lal (1929-2012), India, USA
 Muhammad Akhtar (b. 1933), Pakistan, United Kingdom
 Samuel C.C. Ting (b. 1936), China, USA
 Héctor Croxatto (1908-2010), Chile

TWAS Prize 

The TWAS Prize is an annual award instituted in 1985 by TWAS to recognize excellence in scientific research in the global South.  At inception, the award was titled TWAS Awards in Basic Sciences and was awarded in Physics, Chemistry, Biology and Mathematics categories but was merged with the TWNSO (Third World Network of Scientific Organizations) Prizes in Applied Sciences in 2003 to form the present-day TWAS Prize, which is awarded in nine categories viz. Agricultural Sciences, Biology, Chemistry, Earth Sciences, Engineering Sciences, Mathematics, Medical Sciences, Physics and Social Sciences. The award carries a plaque and a cash prize of  15000 and is open to scientists living and working in a developing country.

See also 
Organization for Women in Science for the Developing World

References

External links

TWAS official website

Members of the International Council for Science
1983 establishments in Italy
Academies of sciences
Trieste
 
Scientific organizations established in 1983
Members of the International Science Council